Tiga Island, also called Tokanod, is a small island in the South Pacific Ocean. The Loyalty Islands are part of the greater archipelago of New Caledonia.

Tiga is part of the commune (municipality) of Lifou, in the Loyalty Islands Province (Province des îles Loyauté), one of three provinces of the Territory of New Caledonia and Dependencies, an overseas territory of France. The population of Tiga Island was 169 in 1996, for a density of about 17 person per km.

The island has occasional commercial air service to its airfield, Tiga Airport

Tiga is featured in the children's novel On the Run (1964), by British author Nina Bawden.

References

Islands of New Caledonia
Loyalty Islands